Black Kiss is a hardboiled erotic American comic book limited series written and drawn by Howard Chaykin, which was originally published in 1988 by Vortex Comics.

Publication history
Black Kiss became one of the most controversial North American comics of the late 1980s, due to the comic having the sort of explicit scenes of sex and violence unseen in most comics published at the time. The twelve-issue series was written and drawn by Howard Chaykin, author of the American Flagg! series which often hinted at the sort of sexual content which Black Kiss showed in detail. In fact, Vortex Comics' usual printer refused to print the book due to its content.

To help retailers who had worries over selling what could be described as pornography, Vortex released the series sealed in a plastic bag. This meant that casual browsers could not open the comic, or obviously see the internal content (however, this was not done when Vortex released a series of collected editions called Big Black Kiss in 1989).

The series attracted a vast amount of controversy, mainly over its sexual content, but also because of the pairing of sex and violence that Chaykin used throughout the series, and especially in the later issues. However, the series attracted praise for bringing the hard-boiled crime genre back into comics, and Chaykin himself was appreciated for his storytelling techniques.

Chaykin has described his thinking behind tackling such controversial topics:

Plot synopsis

The series is set in Los Angeles in the 1980s and opens with Dagmar Laine, a transsexual prostitute and lover to former 1950s film star Beverly Grove, searching for a reel of film taken from the Vatican's collection of pornography. The reel has been sent to Father Frank Murtaugh by his brother who is a Cardinal in the Vatican. Laine tries to grab the reel from Father Murtaugh but the reel is stolen by a nun.

Laine and Grove then get Cass Pollack, a jazz musician and ex-heroin addict who is on the run from the Mafia, to steal the reel in return for them providing Pollack with an alibi. Pollack is also on the run from the police, due to the Mafia killing Pollack's wife and daughter and Pollack being the only suspect.

Laine and Grove (who look virtually identical) provide Pollack with a lead as to where the reel is after the death of Father Murtaugh. This takes Pollack first of all to an occult bookshop called "The Oath of Incannabulata" where he steals a copy of a book about the mysterious "Order of Bonniface". After the bookshop he ends up in a funeral home called "Tanas" where he finds a number of celebrities indulging in bizarre rituals.

Going through Murtaugh's possessions, Pollack finds an invitation to the next meeting of the "Order of Bonniface". He attends this and discovers the Order was formed at the beginning of Hollywood's movie era and that they worship Charles 'Bubba' Kenton, a 1920s film star who was also married to Beverly Grove. He discovers that Kenton forced Grove to give their daughter Sophie up shortly before Kenton became a vampire. After becoming a vampire Kenton forms The Order of Bonniface and turns many of his followers into vampires, including Beverly Grove. This gives Grove the chance of revenge over the loss of her daughter and she switches Kenton's alarm clock so that he wakes during the day and dies in the sunlight.

However The Order want the reel of film as it shows Beverly Grove and Bubba Kenton together in a pornographic film which shows that Grove is much older than she claims to be to the world. They hope she can turn them into vampires and therefore give them eternal youth.

However one of The Order, a young woman called Magda, wants Grove to only make her a vampire. This is because she is Grove's granddaughter, in addition to the nun who stole the reel from Father Murtaugh earlier in the story. Pollack becomes caught in the middle as everyone around him attempts to win, leaving Pollack in a position where he seems unable to survive.

Collected editions
Vortex republished Black Kiss in 1989 in three comic books, four of the original comics per issue, entitled Big Black Kiss.

The series has been collected into trade paperback format several times, including Thick Black Kiss from Vortex in 1993 with an introduction by Sam Hamm, a 2002 edition released by Eros Comix, and a softcover translated in French in 2010 by Delcourt.

A German edition has been published by Austrian publisher Comicothek, including a three-part softcover edition in 1992 as well as a limited hardcover collection in the mid-1990s.
A hardcover collection was published by Norma Editorial in Spanish in 2003 and by Dynamite Entertainment in English in 2010.

The series was released simultaneously as a trade paperback and a hardcover collection by Devir in Portuguese in 2011.

The series was released as a trade paperback by Planeta Komiksów in Polish in 2016.

References

External links

Comics by Howard Chaykin
Horror comics
Fantasy comics
Vortex Comics titles
1980s comics
Transgender-related comics
Gothic comics